Dresden United Football Club was a football club based in the Dresden area of Stoke-on-Trent who were active at the end of the nineteenth century.

History

In 1892, the club were elected to the Combination, where they spent three seasons finishing seventh, fifth and fourth respectively. In 1895, they left the Combination and took up a place in the Midland League. In their two seasons in the Midland League, the club managed finishes in eleventh and tenth place (out of fifteen).

In 1897, Dresden returned to the Combination but were unable to complete the season, with their record being expunged.

Several players from Dresden joined the local Football League clubs, Port Vale or Stoke, including Jack Farrell who left Dresden to join Stoke in 1894. He later played for Southampton, appearing in the 1900 FA Cup Final.

Joe Turner started his career at Dresden before joining Southampton in 1895; he appeared in the 1902 FA Cup Final and also played for Everton.

References

External links
Details on Football Club History Database

Defunct football clubs in England
Association football clubs disestablished in 1897
Sport in Stoke-on-Trent
Defunct football clubs in Staffordshire
1897 disestablishments in England
Association football clubs established in the 19th century